Tarigan is one of the five major clans of Karo people (Indonesia). This clan is believed to originate from the villages around Lake Toba, North Sumatra, Indonesia. They are known as a nation of Umang. This clan has fifteen subclans.

References

Clans
Karo people